Pterostylis basaltica, commonly known as the basalt rustyhood or basalt greenhood is a plant in the orchid family Orchidaceae and is endemic to Victoria. It has a rosette of leaves and eight to fifteen translucent white flowers with green and brown markings and a brownish, insect-like labellum. It is a rare species only known from a small area and is endangered.

Description
Pterostylis basaltica, is a terrestrial,  perennial, deciduous, herb with an underground tuber. The leaves are egg-shaped and pointed and have usually withered by the time the flowers open. Three to five stem leaves are wrapped around the flowering spike. The lateral sepals turn downwards, are more or less parallel, joined at their bases and with a few short white hairs. There are six to eight pairs of spreading white hairs on the sides of the labellum and four shorter hairs on the swollen "head" end. Flowering occurs from November to December.<ref name="DSE">{{cite web|title=Action Statement Basalt Greenhood "Pterostylis basaltica|url=https://www.environment.vic.gov.au/__data/assets/pdf_file/0025/32569/Basalt_Greenhood_Pterostylis_basaltica.pdf|publisher=Victorian Government Department of Sustainability and Environment|accessdate=4 May 2017}}</ref>

Taxonomy and namingPterostylis basaltica was first formally described in 1993 by David Jones and Mark Clements from a specimen collected near Woorndoo and the description was published in Muelleria. The specific epithet (basaltica) refers to the basaltic soils in which this species usually grows.

Distribution and habitat
The basalt rustyhood is only known from a single small area near Derrinallum with two populations on western basalt plains grassland in south-western Victoria.

Conservation
One population of P. basaltica'' occurs on a roadside reserve and has about 1,000 plants and the other, on private property, about 20 plants. None are in a conservation reserve. The main threats to the species are weed invasion, habitat disturbance, altered fire regimes and grazing. The species is classified as "Threatened"  by the Victorian Government and as "Endangered" (EN) under the Australian Government Environment Protection and Biodiversity Conservation Act 1999 (EPBC Act) and a recovery plan has been prepared.

References

basaltica
Endemic orchids of Australia
Orchids of Victoria (Australia)
Plants described in 1993